Mohammed Ajmal Amir Kasab (13 July 1987 – 21 November 2012) was a Pakistani terrorist and a member of the Islamic terrorist organization Lashkar-e-Taiba through which he took part in the 2008 Mumbai terrorist attacks in Maharashtra, India. Kasab, alongside fellow Lashkar-e-Taiba recruit Ismail Khan, killed 72 people during the attacks, most of them at the Chhatrapati Shivaji Terminus. Kasab was the only attacker captured alive by police.

Kasab was born in Faridkot, Pakistan and left his home in 2005, engaging in petty crime and armed robbery with a friend. In late 2007, he and his friend encountered members of Jama'at-ud-Da'wah, the political wing of Lashkar-e-Taiba, distributing pamphlets, and were persuaded to join.

On 3 May 2010, Kasab was found guilty of 80 offences, including murder, waging war against India, possessing explosives, and other charges. On 6 May 2010, he was sentenced to death on four counts and to life imprisonment on five counts. Kasab's death sentence was upheld by the Bombay High Court on 21 February 2011. The verdict was upheld by the Supreme Court of India on 29 August 2012. Kasab was executed by hanging on 21 November 2012 at 7:30 a.m. local time, and subsequently buried within the precincts of Yerwada Central Jail in Pune.

Early life
Kasab was born in Faridkot village in the Okara District of Punjab, Pakistan, to Amir Shahban Kasab and Noor Illahi. His father ran a snack cart while his elder brother, Afzal, worked as a labourer in Lahore. His elder sister, Rukaiyya Husain, was married and lived in the village. A younger sister, Suraiyya, and brother, Munir, lived in Faridkot with their parents. The family belongs to the Qassab community.

Kasab briefly joined his brother in Lahore and then returned to Faridkot. He left home after a fight with his father in 2005. He had asked for new clothes on Eid al-Fitr, but his father could not provide them, which made him angry. He engaged in petty crime with his friend Muzaffar Lal Khan, eventually moving on to armed robbery. On 21 December 2007, Eid al-Adha, they were in Rawalpindi trying to buy weapons when they encountered members of Jama'at-ud-Da'wah, the political wing of Lashkar-e-Taiba, distributing pamphlets. They decided to sign up for training with the group, ending up at their base camp, Markaz Taiba.

An interrogator and deputy commissioner of the Mumbai Police stated that Kasab spoke rough Hindi and almost no English. He said his father in effect sold him to Lashkar-e-Taiba so that he could use the money they gave him to support the family. His father denied it. Zaki-ur-Rehman Lakhvi, a senior commander of Lashkar-e-Taiba, reportedly offered to pay his family  for his participation in the attacks. Another report said the 23-year-old was recruited from his home, in part, based on a pledge by recruiters to pay  to his family if he became a martyr.

Villagers in Okara claimed on camera that he was at their village six months before the attacks in Mumbai. They said that he asked his mother to bless him as he was going for jihad, and claimed that he demonstrated his wrestling skills to a few village boys that day.

Training

Ajmal Kasab was among a group of 24 men who received training in marine warfare at a remote camp in the mountainous areas of Muzaffarabad, Azad Jammu and Kashmir, Pakistan. Part of the training was reported to have taken place on the Mangla Dam reservoir.

Involvement in 2008 Mumbai attacks
Kasab was seen on CCTV during his attacks at Chhatrapati Shivaji Terminus along with another recruit, Ismail Khan. Kasab reportedly told the police that they wanted to replicate the Islamabad Marriott hotel attack, and reduce the Taj Hotel to rubble, replicating the 9/11 attacks in India.

Kasab and his accomplice Khan, then aged 25, attacked the Chhatrapati Shivaji Terminus (formerly Victoria Terminus) railway station. They then moved on to attack a police vehicle (a white Toyota Qualis) at Cama Hospital, in which senior Mumbai police officers (Maharashtra ATS Chief Hemant Karkare, encounter specialist Vijay Salaskar and Additional Commissioner of Mumbai Police Ashok Kamte) were travelling. After killing them in a gun battle and taking two constables hostage in the Qualis, Kasab and Khan drove towards the Metro cinema. Kasab joked about the bulletproof vests worn by the police and killed one constable when his mobile phone rang. The two fired some shots into a crowd gathered at the Metro Cinema. They then drove to Vidhan Bhavan where they fired more shots. Their vehicle had a tire puncture, so they stole a silver Škoda Laura and drove towards Girgaum Chowpatty beach.

The Škoda reached Chowpatty and halted 40 to 50 feet from the barricade. It reversed and attempted a U-turn. A shootout ensued and Khan was killed. Kasab lay motionless playing dead. Assistant sub-inspector Tukaram Omble, armed only with a lathi, charged the vehicle, being shot five times. Omble held onto Kasab's weapon, enabling Omble's colleagues to capture Kasab alive. Omble died from the bullet wounds. A mob gathered and attacked the two terrorists, which was captured on video.

Initially, Kasab pretended to be dead, and was being transported to the Nair Hospital when a police officer discovered Kasab was breathing. Seeing the mutilated body of another slain terrorist, Kasab begged doctors to put him on saline, saying "I do not want to die". The doctors who treated Kasab said he had no bullet wounds.

Kasab told police he was trained to "kill to the last breath". Later, after interrogation in the hospital by the police, he said: "Now, I do not want to live", requesting the interrogators kill him for the safety of his family in Pakistan, who could be killed or tortured for his surrender to Indian police. (Fidayeen suicide squad terrorists were instructed not to be captured and interrogated, use aliases instead of their real names, and hide their nationality.) He is also quoted as saying "I have done right, I have no regrets". Reports also surfaced that the group planned to escape safely after the attack.

Kasab told interrogators that all through the operation, the Lashkar headquarters from Karachi, Pakistan, remained in touch with the group, calling their phones through a voice-over-Internet service. Investigators succeeded in reconstructing the group's journey through the Garmin GPS that was found on Kasab. An email sent from a group calling itself the Deccan Mujahideen claiming responsibility was traced to a Russian proxy, which was then traced back to Lahore with the help of the FBI.

Nationality
Police announced Kasab was a Pakistani national based on his confession and other evidence. Several reporters visited Kasab's village and verified the facts provided by him. Former Pakistan Prime Minister, Nawaz Sharif confirmed that Kasab was from Faridkot village in Pakistan, and criticised President Zardari for cordoning off the village and not allowing his parents to meet anyone.

Journalist Saeed Shah travelled to Kasab's village and produced national identity card numbers of his parents. His parents left town on the night of 3 December 2008. Mumbai Joint Police Commissioner of Crime Rakesh Maria said Kasab was from the Faridkot village in the Okara district of Pakistan's Punjab province, and was the son of Mohammed Amir Kasab.

The Mumbai Police said much of the information that Kasab provided proved to be accurate. He disclosed the location of a fishing trawler, MV Kuber, that the terrorists used to enter Mumbai's coastal waters. He told investigators where his team put the ship captain's body, a satellite phone and a global-positioning device, which the police found.

Pakistani officials, including President Asif Ali Zardari, initially denied Ajmal Kasab was Pakistani. Pakistani government officials attempted to erase evidence that there was a Lashkar-e-Taiba office in Deepalpur. The office was hurriedly closed in the week of 7 December. On the night of 3 December 2008, the parents were whisked away by a bearded Mullah, and since then, there was evidence of a cover-up by plainclothes police. Villagers changed their stories, and reporters who visit there were intimidated. In early December, Kasab's father admitted in an interview that Kasab was his son.

In January 2009, Pakistan's National Security Advisor Mahmud Ali Durrani admitted to Kasab being a Pakistani citizen while speaking to the CNN-IBN news channel. The Pakistan Government then acknowledged that Ajmal Kasab was a Pakistani, but also announced that Prime Minister Yousaf Raza Gilani had fired Durrani for "failing to take Gilani and other stakeholders into confidence" before making this information public, and for "a lack of coordination on matters of national security."

Police interrogation

Naming confusion
On 6 December 2008, The Hindu reported that the police officers who interrogated him did not speak his language, Urdu, and misinterpreted his caste origin "kasai", meaning butcher, to be a surname, writing it as "Kasav".

The Times of India reported a different version of the error. The paper stated that the police officers correctly understood that Ajmal Kasab does not have a surname. To satisfy an administrative requirement that people have surnames, the officers asked Kasab for his father's profession, and decided to use "butcher", or "Kasab" in Urdu, as his surname.

The Hindu referred to him as either "Mohammad Ajmal Amir, son of Mohammad Amir Iman" or "Mohammad Ajmal Amir 'Kasab'".

List of various names used to refer to Kasab:
 Ajmal Kasab
 Azam Amir Kasav
 Ajmal Qasab
 Ajmal Amir Kamal
 Ajmal Amir Kasab
 Azam Ameer Qasab
 Mohammad Ajmal Qasam
 Ajmal Mohammed Amir Kasab
 Mohammad Ajmal Amir Kasar
 Amjad Amir Kamaal
 Mohammed Ajmal Amir Qasab
 Mohammed Ajmal Mohammad Amir Kasab

Confessions
Ammunition, a satellite phone and a layout plan of Chhatrapati Shivaji Terminus was recovered from Kasab. He described how his team arrived at Mumbai from Karachi via Porbandar. He said that they had received revolvers, AK-47s, ammunition and dried fruit from their coordinator. Kasab told the police that they wanted to replicate the Marriott hotel attack in Islamabad, and reduce the Taj Hotel to rubble, replicating the 11 September attacks in the US. Kasab told police that his team targeted Nariman House, where the Chabad centre was located, because it was frequented by Israelis, who were targeted to "avenge atrocities on Palestinians."

Kasab told the police that he and his associate, Ismail Khan, were the ones who shot Anti-Terror Squad chief Hemant Karkare, encounter specialist Vijay Salaskar and Additional Commissioner Ashok Kamte. Kasab entered the Taj posing as a student from Mauritius and stored explosives in one of the hotel's rooms. In December 2009, Kasab retracted his confession in court, claiming he had come to Mumbai to act in Bollywood films and was arrested by the Mumbai police three days before the attacks.

Confessions on video
Kasab repeatedly asked the interrogators to turn the camera off and warned them he would not speak otherwise. Nonetheless the following confessions were recorded on video:

When police asked Kasab what he understood about jihad, Kasab told the interrogators "it is about killing and getting killed and becoming famous." "Come, kill and die after a killing spree. By this one will become famous and will also make God proud."

"We were told that our big brother India is so rich and we are dying of poverty and hunger. My father sells dahi wada in a stall in Lahore and we did not even get enough food to eat from his earnings. I was promised that once they knew that I was successful in my operation, they would give 150,000 rupees (around US$3,352), to my family," said Kasab.

Police said they were shocked by his readiness to switch loyalties after he was apprehended. "If you give me regular meals and money I will do the same for you that I did for them," he said.

"When we asked whether he knew any verses from the Quran that described jihad, Kasab said he did not," police said. "In fact he did not know much about Islam or its tenets," according to a police source.

Face to face with Abu Jundal
On 9 August 2012, Kasab was brought face-to-face with Abu Jundal, the handler of Mumbai attacks, at the Arthur Road jail where they identified each other. Kasab also admitted that Jundal had taught him Hindi.

Other reports

In a press conference, the Mumbai city police commissioner said "The person we have caught alive is certainly a Pakistani. They were all trained by ex-army officers, some for a year, some for more than a year". On 23 November 2008, they set sail from Karachi unarmed to be picked up by a larger vessel. They hijacked the Indian fishing trawler Kuber and set sail for Mumbai.

The Times reported on 3 December 2008 that Indian police were going to submit Kasab to a narco analysis test to definitively determine his nationality.

According to DNA India, Kasab began reading the autobiography of India's non-violent leader Mohandas Karamchand Gandhi in early March 2009, in response to coaxing by prison guards.

Legal issues
Several Indian lawyers refused to represent Kasab citing ethical concerns. A resolution was passed unanimously by the Bombay Metropolitan Magistrate Court's Bar Association, which has more than 1,000 members, saying that none of its members would defend any of the accused of the terror attacks. Other bar associations passed similar resolutions. The Hindu nationalist group Shiv Sena threatened lawyers against representing him. When one attorney, Ashok Sarogi, hinted that he would be willing to represent Kasab, Shiv Shena members protested outside his home and pelted it with stones, forcing him to retract. In December 2008, the Indian Chief Justice K. G. Balakrishnan said that for a fair trial, Kasab needed a lawyer.

An eight-member commission from Pakistan, comprising defence lawyers, prosecutors and a court official was allowed to travel to India on 15 March to gather evidences for the prosecution of seven suspects linked to the 2008 Mumbai attacks. However, the defence lawyers were barred from cross-examining the four prosecution witnesses in the case including Ajmal Kasab.

Kasab wrote to the Pakistani High Commission in India requesting help and legal aid. In the letter, he confirmed he and the nine slain terrorists were Pakistani. He asked the Pakistani High Commission to take custody of the body of fellow terrorist Ismail Khan. Pakistani officials confirmed the receipt of the letter and were reported to be studying it. No further updates were given.

On 1 April 2009, Senior Advocate Anjali Waghmare agreed to represent Kasab, despite Shiv Sena activists having protested and stoned her home.

Trial
His conviction was based on CCTV footage showing him striding across the Chhatrapati Shivaji Terminus with an AK-47 and a backpack. Towards the end of December 2008, Ujjwal Nikam was appointed as Public Prosecutor for trying Kasab and in January 2009, M. L. Tahaliyani was appointed the judge for the case. Indian investigators filed an 11,000-page Chargesheet against Kasab on 25 February 2009. Due to the fact that the chargesheet was written in Marathi and English, Kasab requested an Urdu translation of the charge sheet. He was charged with murder, conspiracy and waging war against India along with other crimes. His trial was originally scheduled to start on 15 April 2009 but was postponed as his lawyer, Anjali Waghmare was dismissed for a conflict of interest. It resumed on 17 April 2009 after Abbas Kazmi was assigned as his new defence counsel. On 20 April 2009, the prosecution submitted a list of charges against him, including the murder of 166 people. On 6 May 2009, Kasab pleaded not guilty to 86 charges. The same month he was identified by eyewitnesses who testified witnessing his actual arrival and him firing at the victims. Later the doctors who treated him also identified him. On 2 June 2009, Kasab told the judge he also understood the Marathi language.

In June 2009, the special court issued non-bailable warrants against 22 absconding accused including Jamaat-ud-Dawa (JuD) chief Hafeez Saeed and chief of operations of Lashkar-e-Taiba, Zaki-ur-Rehman Laqvi. On 20 July 2009, Kasab retracted his non-guilty plea and pleaded guilty to all charges. On 18 December 2009, he retracted his guilty plea and claimed that he was framed and his confession was obtained by torture. Instead he claimed to have come to Mumbai 20 days before the attacks and was simply strolling at Juhu beach when police arrested him. The trial concluded on 31 March 2010 and on 3 May the verdict was pronounced – Kasab was found guilty of murder, conspiracy, and of waging war against India (which also carried the death penalty). On 6 May 2010, he was sentenced to death.

A Bombay High Court bench, composed of Justice Ranjanaa Desai and Justice Ranjit More, heard Kasab's appeal against the death penalty and upheld the sentence given by the trial court in their verdict on 21 February 2011. On 30 July 2011, Kasab moved to Supreme Court of India, challenging his conviction and sentence in the case. Thus, a bench composed of Justice Aftab Alam and Justice Chandramouli Kr. Prasad stayed the orders of the Bombay High Court so as to follow the due process of law, and started hearing the case.

On 29 August 2012, Kasab was again found guilty of waging war and was sentenced to death by the Supreme Court of India.

Execution
Kasab's plea for clemency was rejected by President Pranab Mukherjee on 5 November 2012. On 7 November, Minister of Home Affairs Sushilkumar Shinde confirmed the President's rejection of the petition. The following day, the Maharashtra state government was formally notified and requested to take action. The date of 21 November was then fixed for the execution, and the Indian government faxed their decision to the Pakistani Foreign Office.

Kasab was formally informed of his execution on 12 November, after which he requested government officials to inform his mother. On the night of 18–19 November, a senior prison official at Arthur Road Jail in Mumbai read Kasab's death warrant to him, informing him at the same time that his petition for clemency had been rejected. Kasab was then asked to sign his death warrant, which he did. He was secretly transferred under heavy guard to Yerwada Jail in Pune, arriving in the early morning of 19 November. The death and funeral of nationalist politician Bal Thackeray also aided in diverting attention from Kasab. An officer at Arthur Road Jail stated anonymously: "Throughout the journey from Mumbai to Pune, he did not cause any trouble. Kasab's attitude was of resignation when he came to know that his mercy petition was rejected by the president. Kasab did not shed a single tear during the last few days."

Only the jail superintendent at Yerwada was made aware of Kasab's identity. Kasab was placed in a special cell when he was at Yerwada and no other inmates were informed of his presence. It was only a few minutes before Kasab's execution that the executioner was informed whom he would be hanging.

Though reportedly nervous in the final minutes before his execution, Kasab remained quiet and offered prayers. He was hanged on 21 November 2012 at 7:30 a.m. (local time), according to an announcement by Home Minister Shinde. Kasab's execution by the Maharashtra government happened barely two weeks after President Pranab Mukherjee rejected his mercy petition on 5 November.

After the government contemplated burial at sea, the decision was finally made to bury Kasab at Yerwada Jail. Following his execution, Kasab's body was given to a maulvi for burial in accordance with Islamic rites. Ansar Burney, a human rights activist in Pakistan, later offered to help repatriate Kasab's body to Pakistan citing humanitarian reasons. The Indian government stated it would consider a formal application if offered. Shinde later stated that Kasab's body was buried in India because Pakistan had refused to claim it.

Reaction
Authorities in Uttar Pradesh banned all celebrations and public gatherings and placed the state on high alert in response. Similarly, the Coimbatore City Police took a group of people in Coimbatore into preventive custody for celebrating Kasab's execution. K. Unnikrishnan, father of Major Sandeep Unnikrishnan, said though the execution was necessary, it was not something to "rejoice over" and that the ensuing celebrations were "foolishness."

In Pakistan, the general and official government response was muted, with the media treating the execution as another news item, according to The Hindu. Though some journalists attempted to elicit statements from villagers in Kasab's village of Faridkot, they met with a hostile response. A senior LeT commander issued an anonymous statement, saying Kasab was a hero who would "inspire more fighters to follow his path." The Pakistani Taliban's spokesman Ehsanullah Ehsan issued a statement threatening Indians with retaliation and declaring Kasab would be avenged. Ehsan also made demands for Kasab's body to be returned to his family. "If they don't return his body to us or his family we will capture Indians and will not return their bodies."

While commending on the well appreciated role of two women officers in the smooth handling of the execution, Patil later responded to threats to avenge Kasab's death by stating that anybody daring to attack the soil of Maharashtra would meet the same fate.

Hafiz Saeed and thousands of others offered ghayabana namaz-e-janaza (funeral prayers in absentia) for Kasab at a Jamaat-ud-Dawah session in Muridke. Hundreds of others in Srinagar also offered similar prayers at the appeal of Syed Ali Geelani.

Pakistan Anti-Terrorism Court (ATC) Proceedings

Mudassir Lakhvi, headmaster of the Government Elementary School in Faridkot village, Okara, appeared before the Anti-Terrorism Court (ATC) on 9 May 2014, during the trial of seven suspects, (Zakiur Rehman Lakhvi, Abdul Wajid, Mazhar Iqbal, Hammad Amin Sadiq, Shahid Jameel Riaz, Jamil Ahmed and Younus Anjum), accused of involvement in the attacks on 26 November 2008. He claimed that he knew that Ajmal Kasab was alive, and he had met Ajmal only a few days ago. He repeated the claim in 2015.

See also
 David Headley
 Terrorism in India

Citations

References

 .

 .

1987 births
2012 deaths
21st-century criminals
21st-century executions by India
Islamist mass murderers
Executed Pakistani people
Lashkar-e-Taiba members
Muslims with branch missing
Pakistani Islamists
Pakistani mass murderers
Pakistani people convicted of murder
Pakistani people executed abroad
Pakistani people imprisoned on charges of terrorism
Participants in the 2008 Mumbai attacks
People from Okara District
People executed for murder
People convicted of murder by India
People executed by India by hanging
Punjabi people
Executed mass murderers
Prisoners and detainees of Maharashtra
People convicted on terrorism charges